Dana Henry Rucker (January 28, 1868 – February 1, 1949) was an American football coach. He was the seventh head football coach at the University of Richmond in Richmond, Virginia, serving for four seasons, in 1891 and again from 1893 to 1895, and compiling record of 3–13–3. Rucker also worked in education at the high school level.

Head coaching record

References

External links
 

1868 births
1949 deaths
19th-century players of American football
Player-coaches
Richmond Spiders football coaches
Richmond Spiders football players
People from Fauquier County, Virginia
Coaches of American football from Virginia
Players of American football from Virginia